Garyala is a town and union council in Mardan District of Khyber-Pakhtunkhwa. It is located at 34°16'0N 72°13'0E and has an altitude of 317 metres (1043 feet).

References

Union councils of Mardan District
Populated places in Mardan District